Miguel P. Garcia (born January 19, 1951 in New Mexico) is an American politician and a Democratic member of the New Mexico House of Representatives representing District 14 since January 1997.

Education
Garcia earned his BA from Eastern New Mexico University and his MA from the University of New Mexico.

Elections
1996 Garcia challenged District 14 incumbent Democratic Representative Ray Sanchez in the four-way June 4, 1996 Democratic Primary, winning with 940 votes (44.8%) and was unopposed for the November 5, 1996 General election.
1998 Garcia was challenged in the June 2, 1998 Democratic Primary but won, and was unopposed for the November 3, 1998 General election, winning with 3,802 votes.
2000 Garcia was unopposed for the 2000 Democratic Primary, winning with 1,712 votes and won the November 7, 2000 General election with 4,491 votes (78.2%) against Republican nominee Gwen Poe.
2002 Garcia was challenged in the three-way 2002 Democratic Primary, winning with 1,389 votes (61.3%) and won the November 5, 2002 General election with 3,819 votes (75.5%) against Republican nominee Jerry Sanchez.
2004 Garcia was unopposed for the June 1, 2004 Democratic Primary, winning with 1,912 votes and won the November 2, 2004 General election with 5,357 votes (72.6%) against Republican nominee Clara Pena, who had lost the Republican Primary in 2002.
2006 Garcia and returning 2004 Republican challenger Pena were both unopposed for their June 6, 2006 primaries, setting up a rematch; Garica won the November 7, 2006 General election with 4,631 votes (77.1%) against Pena.
2008 Garcia was challenged in the June 8, 2008 Democratic Primary, winning with 1,943 votes (75.4%); Pena was unopposed for hers, setting up their third contest; Garcia won the November 4, 2008 General election with 6,713 votes (77.6%) against Pena.
2010 Garcia was challenged in the June 1, 2010 Democratic Primary, winning with 1,201 votes (69.4%); Pena was unopposed for hers, setting up their fourth contest; Garcia won the November 2, 2010 General election with 4,187 votes (70.6%) against Pena.
2012 Garcia and his perennial Republican challenger Clara Pena were both unopposed for their June 5, 2012 primaries, setting up their fifth direct contest; Garcia won the November 6, 2012 General election with 5,743 votes (73.2%) against Pena.
 2022 Republican candidate Solomon Peña challenged Garcia and lost 2,033 (26%) to 5,679 (74%) votes.

References

External links
Official page at the New Mexico Legislature

Miguel Garcia at Ballotpedia
Miguel P. Garcia at the National Institute on Money in State Politics

1951 births
Living people
Eastern New Mexico University alumni
Hispanic and Latino American state legislators in New Mexico
Hispanic and Latino American teachers
Democratic Party members of the New Mexico House of Representatives
Politicians from Albuquerque, New Mexico
University of New Mexico alumni
21st-century American politicians